ONF may refer to:

 ONF (band), a South Korean boy band
 Official National Front, a defunct political party in the United Kingdom
 Office national des forêts, the French national forest agency
 Ocala National Forest, in Florida
 Old Northern French, another name for the Old Norman dialect
 Open Networking Foundation, a nonprofit trade organization
 All-Russia People's Front, a political organization
 The National Film Board of Canada,  in French, a public organization